Tiger by the Tail is a 1955 British crime thriller film directed by John Gilling and starring Larry Parks, Constance Smith, Lisa Daniely and Donald Stewart. It is an adaptation of the novel Never Come Back by John Mair. Larry Parks, a memorable Al Jolson in The Jolson Story, had fallen foul of America's House Un-American Activities Committee, and had his first film role for four years starring in this British low budgeter. It was shot at Walton Studios and on location around London. In 1958 it was distributed in the United States by United Artists under the title Cross-Up.

Premise
An American journalist works to expose a criminal gang in London. However, his investigation of their counterfeiting activities leads to his kidnapping by the gang.

Main cast
 Larry Parks as  John Desmond
 Constance Smith as Jane Claymore
 Lisa Daniely as Anna Ray
 Cyril Chamberlain as Foster
 Donald Stewart as Macauly
 Ronan O'Casey as Nick
 Alexander Gauge as Fitzgerald
 Ronald Leigh-Hunt as Doctor Scott
 June Rodney as Young Psychiatric Nurse
 Joan Heal as Annabella
 Thora Hird as Mary
 Doris Hare as Nurse Brady
 Marie Bryant as Melodie
 Russell Westwood as Sam
 John H. Watson as Truscott
 Robert Moore as Clarke
 Hal Osmond as Charlie
 Frank Forsyth as Sergeant Gross
 Alastair Hunter as Hotel Clerk
 Margot Bryant as Cleaning Woman

Critical reception
The Radio Times described the film as "a tatty little tale."
Sky Movies called it a "thoroughly routine British `B' thriller...Familiar situations and backdrops give a competent cast ... little chance to elevate their material above the ordinary. Director John Gilling, who also co-scripted, ensures the thriller is competent in all departments if no more."
Derek Winnert observed that "director John Gilling puts some energy into a busy though stock thriller plot".

References

External links

1955 films
1950s crime comedy films
Films directed by John Gilling
British crime comedy films
1955 comedy films
Films shot in London
Films set in London
Films shot at Nettlefold Studios
1950s English-language films
1950s British films
British black-and-white films